Hoseynabad-e Barkeh Puz (also Romanized as Ḩoseynābād-e Barkeh Pūz; also known as Barkeh Pūzeh) is a village in Sahray-ye Bagh Rural District, Sahray-ye Bagh District, Larestan County, Fars Province, Iran. At the 2006 census, its population was 152, in 36 families.

References 

Populated places in Larestan County